Daniel Thomas Fusco (born December 31, 1975 in Freehold Township, New Jersey) is an American author and lead pastor of Crossroads Community Church in Vancouver, WA.

Early life

Fusco was raised in a spiritually nominal household and came to a saving knowledge of Jesus Christ in April 1998 during his final year at Rutgers University.  After a few years as a professional musician and bassist, Fusco transitioned into pastoral ministry at Calvary Chapel Marin in Novato, California.

Career

Fusco spent his initial years as a pastor planting churches and founded Calvary Chapel New Brunswick in New Jersey; Calvary Chapel North Bay in Mill Valley, CA; and Calvary San Francisco in San Francisco, CA.

After being ordained in 2002, Fusco was sent out to plant Calvary Chapel New Brunswick, located in New Jersey. In November 2006, that church was turned over to his successor so that Fusco could move back to the San Francisco Bay Area to plant more churches. While in the Bay Area, Fusco planted Calvary North Bay in Mill Valley, CA. In 2010, while continuing to pastor the church in Mill Valley, Fusco planted Calvary San Francisco. In 2012, Fusco turned over both churches to move to Vancouver, Washington to become the Lead Pastor at Crossroads Community Church where he presently serves. He is also the founder of the Calvary Church Planting Network which helps facilitate church planters.

Fusco is also a writer and a featured contributor to "Preaching Today" where he has published articles with Leadership Journal, pastors.com, and Calvarychapel.com.

Discography

OM Trio - The Clarified Butter (1999)
OM Trio - Jazz Trio (2000)
Leslie Kendall - This One’s For You … And Me (2000)
OM Trio - Meat Curtain (2000)
Asher / LaMacchia - Evolution (2007)
Michael LaMacchia & Aurea Fernandes - Brazilian Serenade (2008)
Dave Getz Breakaway - Can’t Be The Only One (2011)
The Responding - Your Kingdom is Here (2014)
Triologue - Friday Night in Sausalito (releases in 2016)

Books
Ahead Of The Curve. Tate Publishing (March 29, 2011). .
Honestly: Getting Real About Jesus And Our Messy Lives. NavPress (April 1, 2016). .
Upward, Inward, Outward: Love God, Love Yourself, Love Others NavPress (October 10, 2017). 
Crazy Happy: Nine Surprising Ways to Live the Truly Beautiful Life. WaterBrook (February 16, 2021). .
You're Gonna Make It: Unlocking Resilience When Life Is a Mess. WaterBrook (September 13, 2022). .

References

External links
Official Website
Jesus is Real Radio.
Crossroads Community Church Media Live.
Crossroads Community Church Media Archives.

20th-century American musicians
21st-century American non-fiction writers
21st-century American musicians
American male non-fiction writers
American religious writers
Living people
Musicians from New Jersey
Writers from New Jersey
1975 births
Writers from Vancouver, Washington
20th-century American male musicians
21st-century American male musicians
21st-century American male writers